William Frank Vinen  (15 February 1930 – 8 June 2022) was a British physicist specialising in low temperature physics.

Career 
Vinen was born on 15 February 1930, the son of Gilbert Vinen and his wife Olive Maud Vinen, née Roach. After Watford Grammar School, he attended Clare College, Cambridge, completing a doctorate (PhD) in 1956. He was a Research Fellow there from 1955 to 1958, when he became a Fellow at Pembroke College, Cambridge. In 1962, he was appointed to a Chair of Physics at Birmingham University. He was appointed to the Poynting Chair in 1973. He served as Head of Department from 1973 until 1981, and retired from the University in 1997.

Awards and honours 
Vinen was elected a Fellow of the Royal Society (FRS) in 1973. His certificate of election reads: 

He was awarded the Rumford Medal in 1980 in "recognition of his discovery of the quantum of circulation in superfluid helium and his development of new techniques for precise measurements within liquid helium."

Personal life 
In 1960, Vinen married Susan-Mary Audrey Master; they had one son, Richard, and one daughter, Katie, and lived in Birmingham.

References

1930 births
2022 deaths
20th-century British physicists
Fellows of the Royal Society
Members of Academia Europaea
Academics of the University of Birmingham
Alumni of Clare College, Cambridge
Fellows of Pembroke College, Cambridge